This list comprises all players who participated in at least one league match for Austin Aztex U23 from the team's first season in the USL Premier Development League in 2008 until their last in 2009. Players who were on the roster but never played a first team game are not listed; players who appeared for the team in other competitions (US Open Cup, etc.) but never actually made an USL appearance are noted at the bottom of the page where appropriate.

A
  Joshua Alcala
  Wes Allen
  Edgar Alvarez
  Abdiel Amador
  Keith Armstrong

B
  Kieron Bernard
  Milton Blanco
  Gary Boughton

C
  Edward Campbell
  Leone Cruz
  Andres Cuero
  Jamie Cunningham

D
  Roger Da Costa
  Austin da Luz

E
  Jose Esparza

F
  Beau Fraser
  Elcio Freitas

G
  Miguel Gallardo
  A. J. Godbolt
  Matt Gold
  Manny Gonzalez
  Adam Gross
  Willy Guadarrama

H
  Jeff Harwell
  Kyle Helton
  Michael Hicks
  Craig Hill
  Euan Holden
  Keegan Hudson

K
  Ross Kelly
  Brandon Kirksey
  Kevin Klaus

L
  Ezual Lewis

M
  Robin Martinez
  Kendell McFayden
  Ryan Mirsky
  Robert Mueller

O
  Karo Okiomah
  BJ Olonilua

P
  Beto Papandrea
  Pedro Pereira
  Zach Pope

R
  Stephen Roe

S
  Chris Salvaggione
  Jamie Scope
  Chris Spendlove

T
  Andy Taylor
  Cameron Turney

U
  Marcel Uriarte

V
  Jorge Vega
  Carlos Vicens

W
  Jamie Watson
  Jason Williams
  Nathan Williams

Sources
 

Austin Aztex U23
 
Association football player non-biographical articles